There are several rivers named Das Flores River or Rio das Flores in Brazil:

 Das Flores River (Maranhão)
 Das Flores River (Preto River tributary)
 Das Flores River (Rio de Janeiro)
 Das Flores River (Santa Catarina)